The , also known as "Shizutetsu", is a private railway in Shizuoka Prefecture, Japan, and is majority owned by Tokyu Corporation. In addition to its railway business, the Shizuoka Railway Company owns large bus and taxi services, a department store, supermarkets, a construction company and real estate holdings.

History
The first Shizuoka Railway Company was founded in 1906. It was initially built to connect downtown Shizuoka with Shimizu Port, to facilitate the export of green tea, the major agricultural product of Shizuoka prefecture at the time. The line was electrified in 1919 and became standard gauge in 1920. In 1943, the company was nationalized by the central government, and was merged with smaller railroad operations around Shizuoka Prefecture, under the new name of Shizuoka Railway. Its first chairman was Keita Gotō, founder of the Tokyu Corporation, which emerged as Shizuoka Railway’s primary shareholder after the end of World War II. Most of the rolling stock used by the Shizuoka Railway is used equipment purchased from the Tokyu Corporation.

Lines
Its highway bus system was spun off to a subsidiary company, Shizutetsu Justline, in 2002.

Former tram lines operated by the company include:
 , 1922–1962
 , 1928–1975
 , 1911-1970
 , 1902–1962

External links
  

Railway companies of Japan
Companies listed on the Tokyo Stock Exchange
Companies based in Shizuoka Prefecture
Shizuoka (city)
Railway companies established in 1919
Japanese companies established in 1919